Independencia District is one of eight districts of the province Pisco in Peru.

References

1942 establishments in Peru